Top Country Albums is a chart that ranks the top-performing country music albums in the United States, published by Billboard.  In 2000, 11 different albums topped the chart, based on electronic point of sale data provided by SoundScan Inc.

In the issue of Billboard dated January 1, Canadian singer Shania Twain was at number one with her album Come On Over, the album's 49th week in the top spot. It remained atop the chart for one further week for a final total of 50 weeks at number one, making it the longest-running chart-topper in the history of the Top Country Albums listing.  In 2000, it was recognized by the Recording Industry Association of America as the highest-selling album of all time by a female artist, as well as the biggest-selling country album.  Its time at number one finally came to an end in the issue of Billboard dated January 15 when it was displaced by Fly by the Dixie Chicks, which returned to the top spot having initially reached number one the previous September.  The album had three lengthy spells at number one in 2000 totalling 28 weeks in the top spot.  This brought the album's total number of weeks in the top spot to 36, the fourth highest figure in the chart's history.  It was the second of three consecutive releases by the all-female trio to win the Grammy Award for Best Country Album.

Three acts topped the chart for the first time in 2000.  In June, Lee Ann Womack gained her first number one when I Hope You Dance spent a single week in the top spot.  Two months later, Jo Dee Messina achieved the same feat with Burn.  Finally, Kenny Chesney topped the chart for the first time with his compilation album Greatest Hits.  Chesney would go on to become one of the biggest country music stars of the early 21st century, with 16 chart-topping albums by 2018.  Two other compilations topped the chart in 2000: George Strait spent two weeks at number one with Latest Greatest Straitest Hits and Tim McGraw spent the final four weeks of the year atop the listing with Greatest Hits.  Strait was the only artist to achieve more than one number one during the year, as he also reached the peak position with an eponymous album.  Faith Hill, McGraw's wife, returned to number one with her album Breathe in October, nearly a year after it had topped the chart for an initial two weeks in November and December 1999.

Chart history

References

2000
2000 record charts